Zagorica is a small settlement immediately east of Litija in central Slovenia. The area is part of the traditional region of Lower Carniola and is now included with the rest of the municipality in the Central Sava Statistical Region.

History
Zagorica was a hamlet of Breg pri Litiji until 1995, when it became a separate settlement. A further territorial adjustment between the two villages was made in 2006.

References

External links

Zagorica on Geopedia

Populated places in the Municipality of Litija